During the 2003 invasion of Iraq by a United States–led coalition, the U.S. Defense Intelligence Agency developed a set of playing cards to help troops identify the most-wanted members of President Saddam Hussein's government, mostly high-ranking members of the Iraqi Regional Branch of the Arab Socialist Ba'ath Party or members of the Revolutionary Command Council; among them were some of Hussein's family members. The cards were officially named the "personality identification playing cards".  As of 2021, all but four of the 52 most wanted have died or been either killed or captured, eleven of whom have been released.

About the cards

Each card contains the wanted person's address and, if available, the job performed by that individual. The highest-ranking cards, starting with the aces and kings, were used for the people at the top of the most-wanted list. The ace of spades is Saddam Hussein, the aces of clubs and hearts are his sons Qusay and Uday respectively, and the ace of diamonds is Saddam's presidential secretary Abid Hamid Mahmud al-Tikriti. This strict correspondence to the order of the most-wanted list was not carried through the entire deck, but sometime later in 2003, the list itself was renumbered to conform (almost) to the deck of cards. The card backs feature camouflage reminiscent of that seen on the Desert Camouflage Uniform.

According to US Navy Lieutenant commander Jim Brooks, a spokesman for the Defense Intelligence Agency, such playing cards have been used as far back as the American Civil War and again in World War II—Army Air Corps decks printed with the silhouettes of German and Japanese fighter aircraft fetch hundreds of dollars today—and in the Korean War. Troops often play cards to pass the time, and seeing the names, faces and titles of the wanted Iraqis during their games will help soldiers and Marines in case they run into the wanted individuals in the field, Brooks said.

The list of "Most Wanted" was the result of a multi-intelligence agency collaboration which included the Defense Intelligence Agency, Central Command, and representatives from all US Service Branch Intelligence entities. The "Most Wanted" names were then assigned to their respective cards by five US Army soldiers, 2LT Hans Mumm, SSG Shawn Mahoney, SGT Andrei Salter, SGT Scott Boehmler, and SPC Joseph Barrios, who were assigned to the Defense Intelligence Agency. The pictures used on the cards came from a number of intelligence agencies, but most were derived from "open sources".  The deck of cards was first announced publicly in Iraq on 11 April 2003, in a press conference by Army Brig. Gen. Vincent Brooks, deputy director of operations at U.S. Central Command. On that same evening Max Hodges, a Houston-based entrepreneur, found and downloaded a high-resolution artwork file for the deck from a Defense Department web server. Discovering the following day that the file had vanished from the military web server he became the first eBay seller to offer the artwork file, in PDF, which could be used to reproduce the deck. He quickly contracted Gemaco Playing Card Company to print 1,000 decks for about $4,000 and started selling both the decks, in advance of receiving them from the printer, on eBay, Amazon.com and his own web site. When some of his early auctions for a $4 deck of cards quickly rose to over $120, it did not take long for other eBayers to jump on the bandwagon and print or order decks of their own to sell. In just a few days hundreds of sellers materialized and the price dropped to just a few dollars per deck.

Texas-based Liberty Playing Card Co. received an order to manufacture the cards for the U.S. Embassy in Kuwait and by claiming to be "the authorized government contractor" quickly became another popular domestic supplier for the commercial market. The U.S. military inadvertently included in the jokers the trademarked Hoyle joker owned by the United States Playing Card Company of Cincinnati, Ohio.

List of cards

Other

There are also two jokers: one lists Arab tribal titles, the other Iraqi military ranks. There are no cards for most-wanted No. 45 (was #26), Nayif Shindakh Thamir, No. 53 (was #34 – Killed in 2003 or possibly still fugitive) Husayn al-Awadi, or No. 54 (was #35) Khamis Sirhan al-Muhammad, captured on 11 January 2004. Al-Muhammad was held for six years before being released on 30 July 2010. He fled to Syria where other uncaptured members of the deck of cards were reported to be hiding.

The 13 June 2003 edition of the BBC One satirical news quiz, Have I Got News for You, featured a set of the playing cards in one round, spoofing guest host Bruce Forsyth's 1980s game show Play Your Cards Right (the British version of the American series Card Sharks). The two teams played a version of the latter's main game, retitled Play Your Iraqi Cards Right (although during the segment it was revealed that the writers' first choice had been Play Your Kurds Right), with the same rules (and audience participation). Much of the humour of the round came from the reactions of the two team captains: while Paul Merton was clearly familiar with the game and greatly enjoyed it, his opponent, Ian Hislop, admitted he had never seen Play Your Cards Right and appeared mystified by the game's rules and etiquette (when at one point Merton and the crowd shouted the traditional cry of "lower, lower," to predict the next card in the hidden sequence, Hislop commented, "I'm not sure this programme could get much lower!")

See also

 Archaeology awareness playing cards
 Desert Storm trading cards
 Manhunt (military)
 Mercenaries (video game) – used a similar playing card scheme for enemy leaders.

References

External links

 Brigadier General Vincent Brooks introduces Iraqi cards at CentComm press conference in Doha, Qatar, 11 April 2003.
 "Troops Dealt an Old Tool" by Tom Zucco, St. Petersburg Times, 12 April 2003.
 Personality Identification Playing Cards
 "Card-Carrying Civilians", Time, 12 May 2003, page 25.
 Brigadier General Vincent Brooks introduced the first set of Iraqi freedom cards, 11 April 2003
 Card Makers Producing 'Most-Wanted' Decks: Company Warns Others About 'Joker' Image, 23 April 2003, ClickOnDetroit.com.
 Iraqi Most Wanted Scorecard

Cultural depictions of Saddam Hussein
Defense Intelligence Agency
Iraq War

Playing cards